George Street Playhouse is a theater company in New Brunswick, New Jersey, in the city's Civic Square government and theater district. It is one of the state's preeminent professional theaters, committed to the production of new and established plays.

Under the leadership of Artistic Director David Saint and Managing Director Kelly Ryman, George Street Playhouse presents a main stage season and provides an artistic home for established and emerging theater artists. Founded in 1974 by Eric Krebs, the playhouse has been represented by numerous productions both on and off-Broadway.  Recent productions include the world premiere of The Trial of Donna Caine by Walter Anderson, Little Girl Blue: The Nina Simone Musical, a revised version of I Love You, You're Perfect Now Change, An Act of God with Kathleen Turner, American Son by Christopher Demos-Brown,  Lewis Black's One Slight Hitch, Gettin' The Band Back Together, and Joe DiPetro's Clever Little Lies.  The Tony Award and Pulitzer Prize-winning play Proof, by David Auburn, was developed at GSP during the 1999 Next Stage Series. In addition to its mainstage season, GSP's Touring Theatre features issue-oriented productions that tour more than 250 schools in the tri-state area, and are seen by more than 30,000 students annually.

The theater was originally located on George Street and later moved to its current location on Livingston Avenue.  In 2017, the playhouse moved to an interim location in the former Agricultural Museum on Cook Campus at Rutgers University
In the fall of 2019, George Street Playhouse moved back to the Livingston Ave location into a new mixed-use building, now called the New Brunswick Performing Arts Center.

Production history
1994: Swinging on a Star, a revue of the works of Johnny Burke, premieres at GSP, then moves to Broadway. 
1996: And Then They Came for Me: Remembering the World of Anne Frank is commissioned by GSP for the Touring Theatre Company and is subsequently produced worldwide
2000: Down the Garden Paths by Anne Meara, directed by David Saint and starring Eli Wallach and Anne Jackson, premieres at GSP and moves to Off Broadway.
Syncopation by Alan Knee, which premiered at GSP in 1999, receives Best New Play Award from the American Theatre Critics Association and opens around the country. 
The Spitfire Grill, a new musical by James Valcq and Fred Alley and directed by David Saint, premieres at GSP and moves to Off Broadway
Ancestral Voices by A. R. Gurney, directed by David Saint and starring among others Tim Daly, Amy Van Nostrand, Paul Rudd and Fred Savage
2001: All box office records in the history of GSP are broken with Lady Day at Emerson’s Bar and Grill starring Suzzanne Douglas as Billie Holiday. 
 Venecia by Jorge Accame, adapted and directed by Arthur Laurents starring Chita Rivera
2004: Arthur Laurents updates and directs his Tony Award-winning musical Hallelujah, Baby! starring Ann Duquesnay and Suzzanne Douglas. Following an acclaimed run at George Street Playhouse, the co-production moved to Arena Stage in Washington, D.C. Miss Duquesney is awarded the Helen Hayes Award for her performance. 
Academy Award nominee Amy Irving stars in the world premiere of Charles Evered’s period romp Celadine. 
Wasted by OBIE Award-winner Kirsten Childs premieres. This play about substance abuse was funded with a major grant from the Robert Wood Johnson Foundation
2005: Inspecting Carol, a comedy by Daniel Sullivan from the Seattle Repertory Theatre, starring Dan Lauria and Peter Scolari, becomes the highest grossing play at GSP.  
The West Wing's Richard Schiff stars in Underneath the Lintel, a play by Glen Berger, sets a new record for per-performance attendance.
2006: Jack Klugman stars in The Value of Names by Jeffrey Sweet with Dan Lauria and Liz Larsen.
2007 Artistic Director, David Saint celebrates his 10th Anniversary Season with the opening of The Sunshine Boys starring Jack Klugman and Paul Dooley
Rosemary Harris stars in Oscar and the Lady in Pink by Éric-Emmanuel Schmitt, directed by Frank Dunlop
Dylan Chalfy and Ann Dowd star in Doubt by John Patrick Shanley, directed by Anders Cato
2008: Tony Award Winner Idina Menzel performs a one night only solo concert as the opening of her I Stand Tour.
Roger is Dead, a new play written and directed by Elaine May with Marlo Thomas debuts.
2009 Come Back, Come Back, Wherever You Are, world premiere written and directed by Arthur Laurents with Shirley Knight.
2010: Kathleen Marshall directs the musical Calvin Berger.
2011: David Hyde Pierce directs the musical It Shoulda Been You written by Brian Hargrove and Barbara Anselmi, starring Tyne Daly, Harriet Harris, Edward Hibbert, Richard Kline, and Howard McGillin
 Red (play), with Bob Ari and Randy Harrison

References

External links
George Street Playhouse Home Page

Theatres in New Jersey
1974 establishments in New Jersey
Tourist attractions in New Brunswick, New Jersey
Buildings and structures in New Brunswick, New Jersey
Regional theatre in the United States
Theatre companies in New Jersey